is a Buddhist temple in Kyoto. It stands on Mount Takao to the northwest of the center of the city. The temple adheres to Shingon Buddhism. Its principal image is a statue of Bhaisajyaguru (Yakushi Nyorai), the Buddha of Healing or "Medicine Buddha".

The temple was first established in the year 824, as a merger of two private temples founded earlier by Wake no Kiyomaro. They were the Jingan-ji (神願寺) in Kiyomaro's home province and the Takaosan-ji (高雄山寺).

Treasures 
Jingo-ji holds sixteen National Treasures of Japan. They include the honzon and other statues. This list contains people and deities in 812 who underwent the abhisheka at Takaosan-ji presided by Kūkai.

The Buddhist Sutra "Bimashōkyō", translated by Guṇabhadra, was handed down at the temple. It is "one of the a volume from the Issaikyō (a Buddhist corpus), commonly known as Jingo-ji kyō ... The corpus originally consisted of more than 5,400 volumes in total, but only 2,317 still remain as the rest were scattered outside the temple."

Buildings 

Buildings at Jingo-ji have been destroyed by fire and war. Of the original buildings, only the Daishi-dō survived the Ōnin War; even the present Daishi-dō is of uncertain date. Itakura Katsushige, a daimyō and former Kyoto shoshidai in the Tokugawa shogunate, commissioned a major reconstruction in 1623. Another reconstruction took place in the 1930s with a contribution from  Gendō Yamaguchi. Present structures include the following:

Rōmon (1623)
Kondō (金堂, 1934), housing the central image of Yakushi Nyorai, the Buddha of Healing.
Bishamon-dō (1623)
Godai-dō (五大堂, 1623), housing statues of Fudō Myōō and other wrathful deities.
Bell tower (1623)
Daishi-dō (大師堂, date unrecorded)
Tahōtō (1934)

Buses from the center of the city arrive at a stop alongside the road. A long set of stairs leads down to the river, and a short bridge leads across it. A similar set of stairs leads up to the gate of the temple.

See also 
 - Jingo-ji, Kōzan-ji and Saimyō-ji
 For an explanation of terms concerning Japanese Buddhism, Japanese Buddhist art, and Japanese Buddhist temple architecture, see the Glossary of Japanese Buddhism.
 List of National Treasures of Japan (ancient documents)
List of National Treasures of Japan (paintings)
List of National Treasures of Japan (sculptures)
List of National Treasures of Japan (crafts-others)

Sources
This article incorporates material translated from 神護寺 (Jingo-ji) in the Japanese Wikipedia, retrieved on December 28, 2008.  Other information obtained by Japanese documentary .

References

Buddhist temples in Kyoto
Important Cultural Properties of Japan
Kōyasan Shingon temples